Ambinanitromby  is a rural commune in the region of Fitovinany eastern Madagascar.  It has a population of 9,748 inhabitants.

Rivers
It is situated at the Faraony River.

References

Populated places in Fitovinany